The U.S. Highways in Idaho are the segments of the United States Numbered Highway System owned and maintained by the Idaho Transportation Department (ITD) in the U.S. state of Idaho.



Mainline highways

Special routes

See also

 List of Interstate Highways in Idaho
 List of state highways in Idaho

References

External links

 
U.S. Highways